William Atwater (1440–1521) was an English churchman, who became Bishop of Lincoln in 1514.

He was a Fellow of Magdalen College, Oxford, from 1480. He served as Vice-Chancellor of Oxford University, in the period from 1497 to 1502.

He became vicar of Cumnor in 1495. He became Dean of the Chapel Royal, in 1502. In 1504 he was appointed Canon of the eleventh stall at St George's Chapel, Windsor Castle, a position he held until 1514. He was Chancellor of Lincoln from 1506 to 1512.

References
Concise Dictionary of National Biography
Margaret Bowker (1968), The Secular Clergy in the Diocese of Lincoln, 1495 to 1520
A. Hamilton Thompson (editor) (1940), Visitations in the Diocese of Lincoln 1517-1531. Vol I. Visitations of Rural Deaneries by William Atwater…1517-1520. (Publications of the Lincoln Record Society, Vol. 33.)

Notes

 
 
 

1440 births
1521 deaths
Bishops of Lincoln
Archdeacons of Huntingdon
Archdeacons of Lewes
16th-century English Roman Catholic bishops
Fellows of Magdalen College, Oxford
Vice-Chancellors of the University of Oxford
15th-century English people
Deans of Salisbury
Deans of the Chapel Royal
Canons of Windsor
15th-century English clergy
1440s births